Micropterix aureoviridella is a moth of the family Micropterigidae found in Austria, Germany, Italy, Poland, Slovakia, Slovenia and Switzerland. It was first described by Gabriel Höfner in 1898.

Adults are on wing from the end of May to July. It prefers open and dry habitats on southerly facing slopes, margins of light spruce forest with interspersed rocks, margins of forest and scrubs in mountainous areas, as well as in elfin woodland. It has also been found in sub-alpine dwarf scrub.

The adults feed on some shrubs, including Pinus mugo.

References

External links
Lepforum

Micropterigidae
Moths described in 1898
Moths of Europe
Taxa named by Gabriel Höfner